The Rescuers Down Under is a 1990 American animated adventure film produced by Walt Disney Feature Animation and released by Walt Disney Pictures. The 29th Disney animated feature film and the second movie to be produced during the Disney Renaissance, it is the sequel to the 1977 film The Rescuers, which was based on the novels by Margery Sharp. In The Rescuers Down Under, Bernard and Bianca travel to the Australian Outback to save a boy named Cody from a villainous poacher who wants to capture an endangered bird of prey for money. Directed by Hendel Butoy and Mike Gabriel (in their feature directorial debuts) from a screenplay by Jim Cox, Karey Kirkpatrick, Byron Simpson, and Joe Ranft, the film features the voices of Bob Newhart, Eva Gabor (in her final film role), John Candy, and George C. Scott.

By the mid-1980s, The Rescuers had become one of Disney's most successful animated releases. Under the new management of Michael Eisner and Jeffrey Katzenberg, a feature-length sequel was approved, making it the first animated film sequel theatrically released by the studio. Following their duties on Oliver & Company (1988), animators Butoy and Gabriel were recruited to direct the sequel. Research trips to Australia provided inspiration for the background designs. The film would also mark the full use of the Computer Animation Production System (CAPS), becoming the first feature film to be completely created digitally. The software allowed for artists to digitally ink-and-paint the animators' drawings, and then composite the digital cels over the scanned background art.

The Rescuers Down Under was released to theaters on November 16, 1990, to positive reviews from film critics. However, it struggled at the box office, as it opened on the same day as Home Alone (which also features John Candy). The film went on to garner $47.4 million worldwide.

Plot 

In the Australian Outback, a young boy named Cody rescues and befriends a rare golden eagle called Marahute, who shows him her nest and eggs and gives him one of her feathers. Later on, he falls into an animal trap set by Percival C. McLeach, a local poacher wanted by the Australian Rangers, who has killed Marahute's mate. Realizing Cody has Marahute's feather and must know her location, McLeach kidnaps the boy and throws his backpack to a float of crocodiles. The Rangers find it, and believe that Cody has been eaten.

The mouse who was the bait in the trap hurries to an outpost, from which a telegram is sent to the Rescue Aid Society headquarters in the United Nations, New York City. Bernard and Miss Bianca, the RAS' elite field agents, are assigned to the mission, interrupting Bernard's attempts to propose marriage to Bianca. They go to find Orville the albatross, who aided them before, and meet his brother Wilbur, who flies them to Australia. There, they meet Jake, a hopping mouse who is the RAS' local regional operative. Jake becomes infatuated with Bianca and flirts with her, much to Bernard's dismay. He serves as their "tour guide" and protector in search of the boy. Wilbur accidentally bends his spinal column out of shape trying to help them, so Jake sends him to the hospital (an old ambulance). Wilbur refuses to undergo surgery, but his back is straightened as he fights to escape the medical mice. He flies off in search of his friends.

At McLeach's hideout, Cody is imprisoned with a number of captured animals after refusing to divulge Marahute's whereabouts. Cody attempts to free himself and the animals, but is thwarted by Joanna, McLeach's pet goanna. Realizing that protecting Marahute's eggs is Cody's weak spot, McLeach tricks Cody into thinking someone else killed Marahute and releases him, knowing that Cody will go to her nest. Bernard, Bianca, and Jake arrive as McLeach departs in his halftrack after Cody. The three hitch a ride on the vehicle and warn Cody upon arriving at the nest, but McLeach captures Cody, Marahute, Jake and Bianca. McLeach then sends Joanna to eat Marahute's eggs, but Bernard manages to trick her using egg-shaped stones. Wilbur arrives at the nest, and Bernard leaves Wilbur to sit on the real eggs while Bernard goes after McLeach.

McLeach takes his captives to Crocodile Falls, a huge waterfall at the end of the river he threw Cody's backpack into. He ties Cody up and hangs him over the float of crocodiles, intent on feeding Cody to them to eliminate him as a witness. Bernard, riding a wild razorback pig he tamed using a horse whispering technique he learned from Jake, arrives and disables McLeach's vehicle before he can succeed. McLeach then attempts to shoot the rope holding Cody above the water, but Bernard tricks Joanna into crashing into McLeach, sending both of them into the water. The crocodiles turn their attention to McLeach and Joanna; behind them, Cody falls into the water as the damaged rope breaks. As Joanna flees to the bank, McLeach fends off and taunts the crocodiles, forgetting about the waterfall until it is too late. He tries to swim to shore, but is washed over the edge to his death. Bernard dives into the water and holds Cody long enough for Jake and Bianca to free Marahute, allowing the eagle to save Cody and Bernard just as they go over the waterfall. 

Bernard, desperate to prevent any further interruptions, proposes to Bianca; she immediately accepts, while Jake salutes him with new-found respect. Safe at last, the group departs for Cody's home. Meanwhile, Wilbur is still sitting on Marahute's eggs; they hatch, and one of the eaglets bites him, to his dismay.

Cast 
The Rescuers Down Under features three characters from the first film; Bernard, Bianca and the Chairmouse, all of whom feature the same actors reprising their roles from the original 1977 film.

 Bob Newhart as Bernard, a male grey mouse; the United States representative of the Rescue Aid Society, promoted from his role as janitor to full-fledged agent after proving a success with the previous rescue.
 Eva Gabor as Miss Bianca, a female white mouse; the Hungarian representative of the Rescue Aid Society. This was Eva Gabor's last film role before her death in 1995.
 John Candy as Wilbur, a comical albatross; named after Wilbur Wright. He is the brother of Orville, the albatross who appeared in the first film (named after Orville Wright).
 Adam Ryen as Cody, a young boy able to converse with most animals, the same as Penny in the first film.
 George C. Scott as Percival C. McLeach, a sadistic poacher who wants to capture Marahute for money.
 Frank Welker as Marahute, a giant eagle. Welker also voiced Joanna, McLeach's pet goanna, who enjoys intimidating her captives and has a fondness for eggs; and additional special vocal effects.
 Tristan Rogers as Jake, a debonair, self-confident and charismatic hopping mouse.
 Peter Firth as Red, a male red kangaroo imprisoned by McLeach.
 Wayne Robson as Frank, a fearful and erratic frill-necked lizard imprisoned by McLeach.
 Douglas Seale as Krebbs, a pessimistic koala imprisoned by McLeach.
 Carla Meyer as Faloo, a female red kangaroo who summons Cody to save Marahute. Meyer also voices Cody's mother.
 Bernard Fox as Chairmouse, the chairman of the Rescue Aid Society. Fox also voices Doctor Mouse, the supervisor of the surgical mice who examine Wilbur when he is injured.
 Russi Taylor as Nurse Mouse, the operator of Doctor Mouse's instructions and a competent second-in-command.
 Billy Barty as Baitmouse.
 Ed Gilbert as Francois, a cricket waiter who speaks with a French accent.
 Peter Greenwood as The Airplane Captain and The Radio Announcer.

Production

Development 
By 1984, The Rescuers had become one of Disney's most successful recent animated films, earning $41 million in worldwide box office rentals. Under the new studio management of then-CEO Michael Eisner and studio chairman Jeffrey Katzenberg, it was decided that a feature-length sequel should be produced. Shortly after, the success of Crocodile Dundee (1986) had enhanced the appeal of Australian culture to a mainstream American audience. The new sequel would be set in Australia, for which writing began in 1986.

When Oliver & Company (1988) was nearly complete, Peter Schneider, then-president of Walt Disney Feature Animation, asked supervising animator Mike Gabriel if he would consider directing. At the time, Gabriel declined the offer, stating, "Well, after watching George [Scribner], it doesn't look like it would be much fun." A few months later, Schneider called Gabriel into his office, and asked him if he would direct The Rescuers Down Under, to which Gabriel accepted. After animating the character Tito on Oliver & Company, which was met with praise from general audiences, Hendel Butoy was added as the film's co-director. Meanwhile, Schneider recruited Thomas Schumacher, who had worked at the Mark Taper Forum, to serve as producer on the film.

As the film's producer, Schumacher selected storyboard artist Joe Ranft to serve as story supervisor, believing he had the "ability to change and transform through excellence of idea". Throughout the storyboarding process, Ranft constantly bolstered the creative morale of his crew, but he rarely drew storyboard sequences himself. Ranft also had creative disagreements with the studio's management and marketing executives, including one where he and the story team advocated for an Aboriginal Australian child actor to voice Cody. According to storyboard artist Brenda Chapman, Katzenberg overrode this idea, casting "a little white blonde kid" and giving Cody a matching design.

Because of the rising popularity of Australian-themed action films, and with Americans becoming more environmentally conscious, the filmmakers decided to abandon the musical format from the original film. They had decided that the placement of songs would slow down the pacing for the new film. Instead, they decided to market it as the studio's first action-adventure film, with Butoy and Gabriel taking inspiration from live-action films by Orson Welles, Alfred Hitchcock, and David Lean. It would also be the studio's first animated film since Bambi (1942) to have an animal rights and environmental message. In December 1988, original cast members Bob Newhart and Eva Gabor were confirmed to be reprising their roles. However, Jim Jordan, who had voiced Orville in the original film, died earlier that same year in April following a fall at his home. In acknowledgment of Jordan's death, Roy E. Disney suggested that the character of Wilbur be written as Orville's brother, to serve as his replacement. Intentionally, the names were in reference to the Wright brothers.

Animation and design 
Members of the production team, including art director Maurice Hunt and six of his animators, spent several days in Australia to study settings and animals found in the Australian Outback to observe, take photographs, and draw sketches to properly illustrate the Outback on film. They ventured through the Uluru, Katherine Gorge, and the Kakadu national parks, the inspiration for Hunt's initial designs emphasizing the spectrum of scale between the sweeping vistas and the film's protagonists.

Serving as the supervising animator on the eagle character Marahute, Glen Keane studied six eagles residing at the Peregrine Fund in Boise, Idaho, as well as a stuffed American eagle loaned from the Los Angeles Museum of Natural History and an eagle skeleton. To animate the eagle, Keane and his animation crew enlarged the bird, shrank its head, elongated its neck and wings, and puffed out its chest. Additionally, Keane had to slow the bird's wing movements to about 25–30 percent of an eagle's flight speed. Because of the excessive details on Marahute, who carried 200 feathers, the character appeared for only seven minutes altogether, during the opening and ending sequences.

Furthermore, in order to have the film finished on time, Schumacher enlisted the support of Disney-MGM Studios, which was originally envisioned to produce independent cartoon shorts and featurettes. On their first assignment on a Disney animated feature film, 70 artists contributed ten minutes of screen time, including supervising animator Mark Henn. As one of the film's ten supervising animators, Henn animated several scenes of Bernard, Miss Bianca, and Percival C. McLeach. For the mice characters, Henn studied the mannerisms of Bob Newhart and Eva Gabor during voice recording sessions, and looked to George C. Scott's performance in Dr. Strangelove (1964) for inspiration while animating McLeach. To create believable realism for the Australian animals, additional animators traveled to the San Diego Zoo to observe kangaroos, kookaburras, and snakes, while an iguana from Walt Disney World's Discovery Island was brought into the studio for the animators drawing Joanna.

The Rescuers Down Under is notable for Disney as its first traditionally animated film using only the new computerized CAPS process. CAPS (Computer Animation Production System) was a computer-based production system used for digital ink and paint and compositing, allowing for more efficient and sophisticated post-production of the Disney animated films and making the traditional practice of hand-painting cels obsolete. The animators' drawings and the background paintings were scanned into computer systems instead, where the animation drawings were inked and painted by digital artists. The drawings were later composited with the scanned backgrounds in software to allow for digital compositing like camera positioning, camera movements, multiplane effects, and other camera techniques. Those digital files would then be recorded onto film stock.

The film also uses CGI elements throughout, such as the field of flowers in the opening sequence, McLeach's truck, and perspective shots of Wilbur flying above Sydney Opera House and New York City. The CAPS project was the first of Disney's collaborations with computer graphics company Pixar, which would eventually become a feature animation production studio making computer-generated animated films for Disney before being acquired in 2006. As a result, The Rescuers Down Under was the first animated film for which the entire final film elements were assembled and completed within a digital environment, as well as the first fully digital feature film. However, the film's marketing approach did not call attention to the use of the CAPS process.

Music 

The score for the film was composed and conducted by Bruce Broughton. Unlike the vast majority of Disney animated features, the film had no songs written for it (although "Message Montage" includes a quotation from "Rescue Aid Society" by Sammy Fain, Carol Connors, and Ayn Robbins, the only musical reference to the first film). This was the second Disney film not to include any songs, the first one being The Black Cauldron.

The score received positive critical reception, with critics singling out "Cody's Flight" for its sense of majesty, excitement, and freedom. AllMusic gave the soundtrack 4.5 out of 5 stars.

In 2002, Walt Disney Records reissued the album on compact disc, including the Shelby Flint songs "The Journey", "Someone's Waiting for You" and "Tomorrow Is Another Day" (from The Rescuers). In 2016 Intrada Records released the complete Broughton score, including material (in italics) not used in the movie.

Release 
During the film's theatrical release, the film was released as a double feature with the new Mickey Mouse featurette The Prince and the Pauper.

Home media 
The Rescuers Down Under was released in the Walt Disney Classics video series on September 20, 1991, in a pan-and-scan transfer, while The Rescuers was released on VHS almost a year later on September 18, 1992. Unlike the original film, however, The Rescuers Down Under was not included in the Walt Disney Masterpiece Collection line. Both home video releases went into moratorium on April 30, 1993. In its original release, the VHS edition sold 5.2 million units in the United States, generating $72.8 million in revenue.

Launching in January 2000, Walt Disney Home Video began the Gold Classic Collection, with The Rescuers Down Under re-issued on VHS and DVD on August 1, 2000. The DVD contained the film in its 1.66:1 aspect ratio enhanced for 16:9 television sets and 4.0 surround sound, and was accompanied with special features, including a storybook and trivia as well as an "Animals of the Outback" activity booklet.

The Rescuers Down Under was released alongside The Rescuers on Blu-ray in a "2-Movie Collection" on August 21, 2012, to commemorate the first film's 35th anniversary in the United States.

Reception

Box office 
During its opening weekend, The Rescuers Down Under grossed $3.5 million, ranking fourth, after Home Alone, Rocky V, and Child's Play 2, and below the studio's expectations. As a result, Katzenberg decided to recall the film's television advertising. The film eventually went on to make $27.9 million in the United States and $47.4 million worldwide.

Critical reaction 
The website's critical consensus reads: "Though its story is second-rate, The Rescuers Down Under redeems itself with some remarkable production values – particularly its flight scenes."

Roger Ebert of the Chicago Sun-Times awarded the film 3 out of 4 stars and wrote, "Animation can give us the glory of sights and experiences that are impossible in the real world, and one of those sights, in 'The Rescuers Down Under,' is of a little boy clinging to the back of a soaring eagle. The flight sequence and many of the other action scenes in this new Disney animated feature create an exhilaration and freedom that are liberating. And the rest of the story is fun, too." Likewise giving it three stars out of four, Gene Siskel of The Chicago Tribune summarized the film as a "bold, rousing but sometimes needlessly intense Disney animated feature" where "good fun is provided by a goofy albatross (voiced by John Candy), one in a long line of silly Disney birds". Janet Maslin, reviewing for The New York Times, praised the animation and the action sequences, though she remained critical of the storyline, labeling it "a trifle dark and un-involving for very small children"; Maslin acknowledged that its "slightly more grown-up, adventurous approach may be the reason it does not include the expected musical interludes, but they would have been welcome". Also finding error with "such a mediocre story that adults may duck", the staff of Variety, nevertheless wrote that The Rescuers Down Under "boasts reasonably solid production values and fine character voices".

Halliwell's Film Guide gave it two stars out of four, saying, "[This] slick, lively and enjoyable animated feature [is] an improvement on the original." TV Guide gave the film two stars out of four, saying, "Three years in the making, it was obviously conceived during the height of this country's fascination with Australia, brought on by Paul Hogan's fabulously successful Crocodile Dundee (1986). By 1990, the mania had long since subsided, and this film's Australian setting did nothing to enhance its box office appeal. Further, the film doesn't make particularly imaginative use of the location. Take away the accents and the obligatory kangaroos and koalas, and the story could have taken place anywhere. Another problem is that 'the rescuers' themselves don't even enter the action until a third of the film has passed. And when they do appear, they don't have much to do with the main plot until near the film's end. The characters seem grafted on to a story that probably would have been more successful without them. Finally, the film suffers from some action and plotting that is questionable in a children's film. The villain is far too malignant, the young vigilante hero seems to be a kiddie 'Rambo,' and some of the action is quite violent, if not tasteless."

Josh Spiegel echoes that point and expands on it, explaining, "The Rescuers Down Under tanked with barely $3.5 million in its opening-weekend take, Katzenberg removed all television advertisements for the film. By itself, that's not the worst possible fate, but it proves that he had zero confidence in its ability to perform at a seemingly ideal time of year. Here's the thing: the more demoralizing fact isn't that Katzenberg yanked the marketing. It's that Disney set The Rescuers Down Under up to fail, opening it on the same weekend as a little film called Home Alone, otherwise known as the highest-grossing film of 1990. He may not have been able to predict its long-lasting impact on popular culture, but Katzenberg likely had enough tracking information to tip him off that Home Alone would be a monster laying waste to everything in its path. The Rescuers Down Under was forced to take the hit, then and afterwards." Conversely, Ellen MacKay of Common Sense Media gave the film four out of five stars, writing, "A rare sequel that improves on the original".

References

External links 

 
 
 
 
 

1990 animated films
1990 directorial debut films
1990 films
1990s adventure films
1990s American animated films
1990s buddy comedy films
1990s children's animated films
1990 comedy-drama films
1990s crime drama films
1990s crime comedy films
1990s fantasy comedy films
1990s English-language films
American adventure drama films
American buddy comedy films
American children's animated adventure films
American children's animated comedy films
American children's animated drama films
American children's animated fantasy films
American coming-of-age films
American crime drama films
American crime comedy films
American fantasy adventure films
American sequel films
Animated buddy films
Animated coming-of-age films
Animated films about birds
Animated films about reptiles
Animated films based on children's books
Animated films set in New York City
Disney Renaissance
Films about child abduction
Films about animals
Films based on British novels
Films based on works by Margery Sharp
Films directed by Hendel Butoy
Films directed by Mike Gabriel
Animated films about mice
Films about animal rights
Films about hunters
Films scored by Bruce Broughton
Films set in the Outback
Films with screenplays by Joe Ranft
Films with screenplays by Karey Kirkpatrick
Walt Disney Animation Studios films
Walt Disney Pictures animated films